Sarai Mohana is a census town in the Varanasi district of Uttar Pradesh, India. The Varuna River flows into the Ganges nearby, making the area prone to flooding.

The village's inhabitants are a mixture of Hindu and Urdu speakers.

References

Census towns in Varanasi district
Caravanserais in India